Claudius Weber (born April 15, 1978) is a German former footballer. He spent one season in the Bundesliga with 1. FSV Mainz 05.

References

1978 births
Living people
People from Opole
German footballers
1. FSV Mainz 05 players
SV Wehen Wiesbaden players
VfB Lübeck players
Bundesliga players
2. Bundesliga players
Association football forwards
TSV Eintracht Stadtallendorf players